Belinda Jane Haggett (married name Belinda Robertson; born 12 October 1962) is an Australian former cricketer who played as a right-handed batter and right-arm medium bowler. She appeared in 10 Test matches and 37 One Day Internationals for Australia between 1986 and 1993. She played domestic cricket for New South Wales.

Cricket career
A right-handed batter and occasional right-arm medium pace bowler, Haggett played 10 Test matches for Australia between 1987 and 1992, scoring 762 runs including four half-centuries and two centuries. On her Test debut, she scored 126 runs against England. She made a further century, and her highest Test score, in February 1991 against India, scoring 144.

Haggett also played 37 One Day Internationals for Australia, scoring 913 runs with an average in the low-thirties.

References

External links
 
 
 Belinda Hagget at southernstars.org.au

1962 births
Living people
Cricketers from Sydney
Australia women Test cricketers
Australia women One Day International cricketers
New South Wales Breakers cricketers
Women cricketers who made a century on Test debut